Earl Patrick Taylor, known as Earlly Mac, is an American rapper, songwriter, and record producer. He is known for his collaborations with Big Sean. In 2010 he released his debut mixtape, Party Up!. His debut EP, God Knows, was self-released in January 2015. The EP included the single "Do It Again" featuring Big Sean, which peaked at number 6 on the Billboard Twitter Emerging Artists chart.

Early life and career
Earl Patrick Taylor was born in Detroit, Michigan. Mac grew up listening to Eminem, Rock Bottom, D12 and Obie Trice.

In 2016, he signed to Pulse Music Group as a songwriter, co-writing notable songs such as G-Eazy's song "No Limit", Big Sean's song "Pull Up n Wreck", and Jhené Aiko's song "None of Your Concern", among others.

Discography

EPs

Mixtapes

Singles

As lead artist

As featured artist

References

Living people
African-American male rappers
Rappers from Detroit
21st-century American rappers
21st-century American male musicians
Year of birth missing (living people)
21st-century African-American musicians